Chanso Horam (born 29 October 2001) is an Indian professional footballer who plays as a winger for I-league club Rajasthan United, on a loan from Mumbai City.

Career

Early Years
Chanso started his journey playing in the Manipur State League, where he represented several clubs and gathered a lot of experience when he was called-up for the Manipur state camp ahead of the Santosh Trophy in 2018. A year later he inspired Yarkhok United to qualify for the Manipur State League in 2019.

Yarkhok United defeated KIYC 4-2 over two legs in the final to become the first team from Ukhrul district to qualify for the Manipur State League in 2019. Horam was one of the players who registered his name on the scoresheet and was an influential figure throughout the season. His consistent performances convinced NEROCA to rope in the youngster.

Club career
He made his I-League professional debut for Neroca on 30 November 2019 at EMS Stadium against Gokulam Kerala FC, he started and played full match as they lost 2-1.

On 31 October 2020 Chanso signed for Mumbai City FC.

Playing style
He is a technically sound player and primarily plays as an attacking midfielder. However, his pace gives him an added advantage thus, allowing him to play as a right-winger too. He even helps the team in pressing and defense when not in possession.

Career statistics

Club

References

2001 births
Living people
People from Manipur
Indian footballers
NEROCA FC players
TRAU FC players
Rajasthan United FC players
I-League players
Footballers from Manipur
Association football midfielders